GHD may refer to:

Companies
 Good Hair Day, a British manufacturer of hair straighteners and other hair-care products
 Kintetsu Group Holdings, a Japanese conglomerate 
 GHD Group, an international professional services company based in Australia

Health and medicine
 Global Handwashing Day, an annual campaign
 Global Health Delivery Project, at Harvard University
 Growth hormone deficiency

Places
 Gillette Historic District, in Tulsa, Oklahoma, United States
 Guthrie Historic District (Guthrie, Oklahoma), United States

Transport
 Gateshead Interchange, England
 Garwa Road Junction railway station, Jharkhand, India
 Keilor Plains railway station, Victoria, Australia

Other
 GHDs, colloquial term for hair straightening irons 
 Good Humanitarian Donorship Principles, the standard for the Humanitarian Response Index
 GHD or Glute Ham Developers, an exercise equipment